RZ Normae is an R Coronae Borealis type variable star in the constellation Norma. It has a baseline magnitude of 10.2, dropping down to dimmer than 16.2 at its minima. It was discovered by the astronomer Sergei Gaposchkin in 1952.

It has around 60% the mass of the Sun and an effective (surface) temperature of around 6750 K.

References 

Normae, RZ
R Coronae Borealis variables
Norma (constellation)